Big Wow is the second album by Scottish rock band Whiteout, released in 1998 (see 1998 in music). Andrew Jones and Stuart Smith—who were members of Whiteout when they started out in 1994—had left the band after the release of their first full-length album, Bite It, in 1995. Warren McIntyre took over on vocals for a run of gigs, then the two remaining members, Paul Carroll and Eric Lindsay, continued as a three-piece with original (pre-1994) drummer Mark Fairhurst who is named "Fudge" in the album liner notes, although Jim McDermott was drafted in for the majority of Big Wow. Carroll, Lindsay and Fairhurst continued gigging adding Eric Russell on keys and finally folding in 1999 despite much new material.

Track listing 
All songs written by Carroll/Lindsay

 "Kickout" – 3:36
 "Heaven Sent" – 3:28
 "Selling Up" – 3:25
 "Through All the Rain" – 5:49
 "435" – 4:28
 "I Don't Wanna Hear About It" – 2:28
 "Running for Cover" – 3:34
 "Out on the Town" – 4:43
 "Take It with Ease" – 3:09
 "Get Back Whatcha Give" – 3:37
 "Back Where I Used to Be" – 5:56

The Japanese edition features two additional tracks:

<li>"No Money, No Honey" – 3:44
<li>"To Carry Us Through" – 2:50

Personnel 
 Paul Carroll – vocals, bass, piano, organ, acoustic guitar
 Eric Lindsay – vocals, guitar
 Mark Fairhurst – drums (on tracks 4 and 5)

Additional personnel
 Jim McDermott – drums on all tracks except 4 and 5
 Natalie Box – strings on tracks 4, 7 and 11
 Rebecca Chambers – strings on tracks 4, 7 and 11
 Antonia Fuchs – strings on tracks 4, 7 and 11
 Simon Trentham – strings on tracks 4, 7 and 11
 Gerry Hogan – pedal steel on track 7
 John Williams – mellotron on track 11

Production 
 Producer: Oransay Avenue
 Producer: Brian O'Shaughnessy
 Producer: Kenny Paterson (only track 1)
 Mixer: Brian O'Shaughnessy
 Engineer: Brian O'Shaughnessy
 Engineer: Kenny Paterson
 Assistant engineer: Paul Middleton
 String arrangement: Natalie Box
 Mastering: David Fisher at Waterfront
 Cover design: Embryo Graphics

References 

1998 albums
Whiteout (band) albums